João Emanuel Ferreira Souza (born 17 August 1993), commonly known as Birungueta, is a Brazilian footballer who currently plays as a midfielder for Treze.

References

1993 births
Living people
Brazilian footballers
Brazilian expatriate footballers
Brazilian expatriate sportspeople in Albania
Expatriate footballers in Albania
FK Kukësi players
Esporte Clube Jacuipense players
Nacional Atlético Clube (Patos) players
Associação Olímpica de Itabaiana players
Kategoria Superiore players
Association football midfielders